Alejandro Claveaux Martinez (born 1 March 1983) is a Brazilian actor.

Biography
Claveaux was born in Goiânia, the son of Uruguayan parents of French and Spanish origin. He graduated in food engineering and came to work in the profession for about three years, but he decided to pursue his acting career after taking a course in performing arts at the college, which made him move to Rio de Janeiro.

In August 2022, he revealed that he was in a relationship but did not share the name of his boyfriend, who does not work in the artistic world, for privacy reasons.

Career
In 2007, he began his career in the telenovela Luz do Sol, and he also made a special guest appearance in Mandrake the same year. In 2010 he gained prominence in the series Clandestinos: The Dream Began, in which he played the former model Alejandro, since the characters in the series had the same name of the actors. In 2011, he played a part in Insensato Coração as Paulo, the boyfriend of a homosexual singer. In the same year, he enters the cast of the nineteenth season of the youth series Malhação, where he plays Moisés. Between 2012 and 2013 he made appearances in Rede Globo series, until in 2014 he joined the cast of the crime series O Caçador, where he played a delegate in conflict with his brother, as they were both disputing the same woman. After the end of O Caçador, he made a participation in the first chapters of Império as Josué in the young phase. In 2014, he was cast to play the comic villain César in Alto Astral.

Filmography

Television

Film

Stage

References

External links 

1983 births
21st-century Brazilian male actors
Brazilian male film actors
Brazilian male stage actors
Brazilian male telenovela actors
Brazilian male television actors
Brazilian people of French descent
Brazilian people of Spanish descent
Brazilian people of Uruguayan descent
Brazilian LGBT actors
Living people
People from Goiânia